Henry M. Henderson was the third mayor of the Village (now City) of Flint, Michigan serving from 1857 to 1858.

Early life
In 1836, Henry M. Henderson left Livingston County, New York and came to Flint opening a dry goods business together with his brother, James. In 1842, the brother constructed the Henderson block. When the First National Bank was formed in 1865, Henderson became president  and a director of the bank.

Political life
He was elected as the third mayor of the Village of Flint in 1857 serving a one-year term.

References

Mayors of Flint, Michigan
19th-century American politicians
American bank presidents